The 1909 Pittsburgh mayoral election was held on Tuesday, February 16, 1909. Republican nominee William A. Magee was elected mayor of Pittsburgh over Civic Party and Prohibition candidate W.H. Stevenson and Democratic candidate George R. Herst.

Campaign
Former city councilman and state senator William A. Magee, an unsuccessful candidate in the 1906 Republican mayoral primary, decided to run again for mayor in 1909. His campaign emphasized potential civic improvement projects including the removal of a hill ("the hump") in the area around Grant Street, the widening of certain streets, and improvement of riverfronts. Although opposed by some of the Republican leadership, Magee won the Republican primary over city treasurer John F. Steel by a vote of 41,917 to 22,210.

The strongest opposition to the Republicans came from the Civic Party, an organization of anti-corruption reformers. Its nominee was city councilman William H. Stevenson, whose candidacy was also supported by the Prohibition Party.

Dr. George R. Herst won the Democratic primary with no close competitors.

General election results

Stevenson received 13,151 votes on the Civic Party ticket, 3,823 on the Prohibition ticket, and 34 other votes.

References

1909
1909 United States mayoral elections
February 1909 events
1909 Pennsylvania elections